Sere is a name which is used as a surname and a given name. People with the name include:

Surname
Amadou Séré (born 1987), Burkinabé football player
Boubacar Séré (born 1984), Burkinabé athlete
Emile La Sére (1802–1882), American politician
Émilienne de Sère, French singer 
Kaisa Sere (1954–2012), Finnish computer scientist

Given name
Sere Matsumura (born 2003), Japanese football player

Other uses
 Sere (rapper) (born 1976), stage name of Finnish rapper Matti Huhta
Octave Séré, pseudonym of the French music critic Jean Poueigh